Avenida Presidente Julio Argentino Roca, better known as Diagonal Sur (Spanish for "South Diagonal", the counterpart to Diagonal Norte), is an important avenue in the Monserrat neighborhood of Buenos Aires, Argentina. It is oriented north-east/south-west, diagonally bisecting the city blocks (manzanas) which give the city centre a checkerboard plan. It is named after President Julio Argentino Roca, who held power from 1880 to 1886, and from 1896 to 1904.

Connections
The north-west corner of Plaza de Mayo is the start of Avenida Presidente Julio Argentino Roca (i.e. the corner of Hipolito Yrigoyen and Bolivar street), just to the north of the Palace of the City Legislature. At the junction with Peru street is located equestrian monument to Julio Argentino Roca.

Underground
Below the entire length of the avenue runs  line  of the Buenos Aires Underground, which has two stations along the Diagonal (stations  Bolívar and Belgrano).

Gallery

References

Roca